The Steilerhorn is a mountain of the Swiss Lepontine Alps, located north of Splügen in the canton of Graubünden. It lies between the valleys of the Stutzbach and the Steilerbach, south of the Alperschällihorn.

References

External links
 Steilerhorn on Hikr

Mountains of the Alps
Mountains of Graubünden
Lepontine Alps
Mountains of Switzerland
Two-thousanders of Switzerland
Rheinwald